Bonthe is a coastal town located on Sherbro Island in Bonthe District in the southern Province of Sierra Leone. The town lies on the eastern shore of Sherbro Island, on the Sherbro River estuary. Bonthe is about 60 miles south-west of Bo and 187 miles south-east of Freetown.

Bonthe is by far the smallest of Sierra Leone's six municipalities and is directly governed by a city council, headed by a mayor.  The municipality of Bonthe had a population of 9,535 in the 2004 census, with a current estimate of 10,206.

The major industry in Bonthe is fishing. In colonial times the town used to be a major trading centre for piassava and other agricultural products.

The population of Bonthe is ethnically diverse, though mainly from the Sherbro, and Mende ethnic groups. As with most parts of Sierra Leone, the Krio language of the Sierra Leone Creole people is by far the most widely spoken language in Bonthe and is the primary means of communication in the city.

Media
The local radio station in Bonthe is Radio Bontico 96.4. The Sierra Leone Broadcasting Services (SLBS) TV, is on the air in the city.

Climate

References

Populated places in Sierra Leone
Southern Province, Sierra Leone
Sherbro people